The Men's large hill individual ski jumping competition for the 2006 Winter Olympics was held in Pragelato, Italy. It began on 17 February, and concluded on 18 February.

Results

Qualifying

Fifteen skiers were pre-qualified, on the basis of their World Cup performance, meaning that they directly advanced to the final round. These skiers still jumped in the qualifying round, but they were not included with non-pre-qualified skiers in the standings. The fifty-one skiers who were not pre-qualified competed for thirty-five spots in the final round.

Final
The final consisted of two jumps, with the top thirty after the first jump qualifying for the second jump. The combined total of the two jumps was used to determine the final ranking.

References

Ski jumping at the 2006 Winter Olympics